Science East is an interactive science museum located in Fredericton, New Brunswick, Canada.  It uses innovative, interactive science exhibits to demonstrate basic science concepts, prompt curiosity and foster interest and understanding of science among people of all ages.  The museum also features travelling exhibits which tour the province.  It was founded in 1994, and since 1999 it has been accommodated in what used to be the York County jail.  Constructed in 1842, the jail constitutes a tourist attraction in itself.

Affiliations
The museum is affiliated with the Canadian Museums Association and the Virtual Museum of Canada.

References

Trip Advisor Review

External links
Science East

Science museums in Canada
Museums in Fredericton